Delane may refer to:

DeLane Fitzgerald, American football coach in the United States
DeLane Matthews (born 1961), American actress
Dennis Delane (died 1750), Irish actor
John Thadeus Delane (1817–1879), editor of The Times (London), born in London